Melle is a municipality located in the Belgian province of East Flanders. On 1 January 2018 Melle had a total population of 11,574. The total area is 15.21 km² which gives a population density of 761 inhabitants per km².

Melle was mentioned in documents in 830, although the archeological findings prove the region was inhabited long before that date.

The name Melle has two possible derivations: the Celtic word melina means "brown water"; the prehistoric name Melinos means "honey yellow".

The village of Melle consists of three regions: Melle-Centre, Melle-Vogelhoek and Gontrode (since the fusion in 1976).

One of its famous products is the Delirium Tremens beer, bottled by the Huyghe brewery. This beer is exported worldwide and was voted "Best beer in the world" in 1998 at the World Beer Championships in Chicago, Illinois, USA.

Miss Belgium 2000, Joke van de Velde grew up and went to high school in Melle.

The College van de paters Jozefieten, founded in 1837 by canon Constant Van Crombrugghe is known all around the country. Several Belgian and international celebrities went to this school (e.g. Cédric Van Branteghem (runner), a brother of Princess Mathilde). It was the first school in Belgium where a commercial science and an industrial science course were offered. An Irish student brought along a football in 1863. This was the first football to reach the European continent.

The village gained more national fame thanks to the TV show Schalkse Ruiters, which featured host Bart De Pauw playing a comedy character named The Man from Melle and who claimed to be from the (then non-existent) Koekoekstraat nr. 70 in Melle. At a certain point the city council decided to name one of their new streets Koekoekstraat and painted a door with house number 70 on the wall.

References

External links 

Melle (Dutch Only)
Webpage at Reocities

 
Municipalities of East Flanders
Populated places in East Flanders